The Kokilavan Dham is the place where the famous Shani Dev Temple is situated in Kosi Kalan near Mathura in Uttar Pradesh, India. This is very ancient temple of Shani Dev and his guru Barkhandi baba. Devotees from all over India come here to do pooja here.

Hindu temples in Mathura district